Dammarie-sur-Loing (literally Dammarie on Loing) is a commune in the Loiret department in north-central France.

See also
Communes of the Loiret department

References

Dammariesurloing